The Wolseley 15/60 is an automobile which was produced from 1958 to 1961, and then, as the Wolseley 16/60, from 1961 to 1971. The 15/60 was the first of the mid-sized Pininfarina-styled automobiles manufactured by the British Motor Corporation (BMC). Launched in December 1958 as part of BMC's Wolseley brand, the design would eventually be shared with seven other marques. All of the cars were updated in 1961 with a larger engine and new model designations. The Wolseley 16/60 was the last, in production until 24 April 1971.

Note that there were two other Farina-styled car lines launched by BMC at the same time — the compact Austin A40 Farina and large Wolseley 6/99/Austin A99 Westminster and derivatives.


Wolseley 15/60

The first generation of the mid-sized unitary construction Farinas was introduced with the Wolseley 15/60. Within months, the similar Riley 4/68, Austin A55 Cambridge Mark II, MG Magnette Mark III, and Morris Oxford V appeared as well.  With its leather seats and polished wooden dashboard the Wolseley was positioned as the up-market non-sporting version in the range.

All five cars used the 1.5 L (1489 cc) B-Series inline-four engine, though different tuning gave varying power output.  The Wolseley, together with the Austin Cambridge and the Morris Oxford, was at the bottom and with its single SU carburettor gave just . The front suspension was independent using coil springs with a live axle and semi elliptic leaf springs at the rear. The brakes were by Girling, hydraulically operated, with 9 in. (229 mm) drums. A cam and peg steering system was used.

The upholstery was in leather and had individual front seats that were set closely together to allow a central passenger to be carried allowing the car to be advertised as seating six although there was a floor mounted gear lever. The handbrake was between the driver's seat and the door. The rear seat had a folding central armrest. Wood veneer was used on the fascia and door cappings. A Smiths heater was fitted as standard. Either single or, as an option, two colour paint was used.

The Wolseley version was particularly easy to identify on the roads after dark thanks to the small illuminated badge on its grille, a feature shared with other Wolseleys of the period.

Later, the Farina design was licensed in Argentina and produced as the Di Tella 1500, Traveller, and Argenta.

The test car cost £991 including taxes of £331.

Wolseley 16/60

The 15/60 was replaced by the Wolseley 16/60 in September 1961. For some buyers, the most important change was the availability of Borg Warner 35 automatic transmission. Buyers choosing the four-speed manual transmission version may have been disappointed to find that the 1961 16/60 still came without synchromesh on first gear. By this time all-synchromesh gear-boxes were the norm for most competitor vehicles in the UK.

Viewed from the outside, the Wolseley 16/60 was differentiated from the 15/60 by the overriders on the bumpers which protruded more than on the earlier car: the plastic mouldings on the rear lights were also modified along with the rear fins, now much reduced in their sharpness.

The 1600 cc Farina models mostly remained in production through to 1968. However, with no rear wheel drive Wolseley-badged replacement produced, the Wolseley 16/60 model continued to be offered for sale until early 1971.

The 16/60 models generally used the 1.6 L (1622 cc) B-Series engine.

See also
 Wolseley 24/80 — a six-cylinder car derived from the British model and produced in Australia between 1962 and 1965.

References

External links

 Cambridge-Oxford Owners' Club
 The Wolseley Owners Club

15 60
Cars introduced in 1958
Compact executive cars
1960s cars
1970s cars
Rear-wheel-drive vehicles
Sedans